Othorene verana is a species of moth of the family Saturniidae.

Distribution

References

Moths described in 1900
Othorene